Euphorbia marie-cladieae, is a species of flowering plant in the spurge family Euphorbiaceae. It is endemic to Socotra, Yemen, where it is found in western tip of the island.

References

External links

marie-cladieae
Plants described in 2013
Flora of Socotra
marie-cladieae